This article concerns the rotation operator, as it appears in quantum mechanics.

Quantum mechanical rotations
With every physical rotation , we postulate a quantum mechanical rotation operator  which rotates quantum mechanical states.

In terms of the generators of rotation,

The translation operator

The rotation operator , with the first argument  indicating the rotation axis and the second  the rotation angle, can operate through the translation operator  for infinitesimal rotations as explained below. This is why, it is first shown how the translation operator is acting on a particle at position x (the particle is then in the state  according to Quantum Mechanics).

Translation of the particle at position  to position :         

Because a translation of 0 does not change the position of the particle, we have (with 1 meaning the identity operator, which does nothing):

Taylor development gives:

with 

From that follows:

This is a differential equation with the solution 

Additionally, suppose a Hamiltonian  is independent of the  position.

In relation to the orbital angular momentum
Classically, an infinitesimal rotation  of the vector  about the -axis to  leaving  unchanged can be expressed by the following infinitesimal translations (using Taylor approximation):

From that follows for states:

And consequently:

Using 

with  the -component of the angular momentum according to the classical cross product.

To get a rotation for the angle , we construct the following differential equation using the condition :

Similar to the translation operator, if we are given a Hamiltonian  which rotationally symmetric about the -axis,  implies . This result means that angular momentum is conserved.

Effect on the spin operator and quantum states

Operators can be represented by matrices. From linear algebra one knows that a certain matrix  can be represented in another basis through the transformation

where  is the basis transformation matrix. If the vectors  respectively  are the z-axis in one basis respectively another, they are perpendicular to the y-axis with a certain angle  between them. The spin operator  in the first basis can then be transformed into the spin operator  of the other basis through the following transformation:

So we have:

Comparison with  yields .

This means that if the state  is rotated about the -axis by an angle , it becomes the state , a result that can be generalized to arbitrary axes.

See also

Symmetry in quantum mechanics
Spherical basis
Optical phase space

References
L.D. Landau and E.M. Lifshitz: Quantum Mechanics: Non-Relativistic Theory, Pergamon Press, 1985
P.A.M. Dirac: The Principles of Quantum Mechanics, Oxford University Press, 1958
R.P. Feynman, R.B. Leighton and M. Sands: The Feynman Lectures on Physics, Addison-Wesley, 1965

Rotational symmetry
Quantum mechanics